is a light novel publishing imprint affiliated with the Japanese publishing company Shogakukan. It was established in May 2007. The imprint is aimed at a male audience, while its sister imprint that was established at the same time, Lululu Bunko, is aimed at a female audience. In May 2008, Shogakukan introduced a separate imprint titled Gagaga Bunko R or Gagaga Bunko Revival, which republishes works from the defunct label Super Quest Bunko.

Published titles

!–9

A

B

C

D

E

F

G

H

I

J

K

L

M

N

O

P

R

S

T

V

W

Y

Z

References

External links
 
Official website Lululu 

 
Book publishing company imprints